The CCHA Coach of the Year is an annual award given out at the conclusion of the Central Collegiate Hockey Association regular season to the best coach in the conference as voted by the coaches of each CCHA team.

The longest continually conferred award in CCHA history, the 'Coach of the Year' was first awarded in 1976 and every year thereafter until 2013 when the original CCHA was dissolved as a consequence of the Big Ten Conference forming its men's ice hockey conference. After the CCHA was revived in 2021–22 by seven schools that left the men's Western Collegiate Hockey Association, the Coach of the Year award was reinstated.

Ron Mason and Jeff Jackson are the only coaches to win the award with multiple teams.

Award winners

Winners by school

Multiple Winners

See also
CCHA Awards

References

General

Specific

External links
CCHA Awards (Incomplete) 

Central Collegiate Hockey Association
College ice hockey coach of the year awards in the United States
College ice hockey trophies and awards in the United States